Khafaja or Khafajah (also known as Al-Khafaji and Khafaji) is one of the major Arab tribes (especially in Iraq and Egypt) as well Saudi Arabia , Syria and Jordan .

See also
Ibn Khafaja
 Shihab al-Din al-Khafaji
Khafajah
Khafajiyeh
Banu Uqayl

References

Arab groups
Tribes of Arabia
Tribes of Iraq
Banu Uqayl